Gamma Phi Beta Sorority House may refer to:
Gamma Phi Beta Sorority House (Urbana, Illinois)
Gamma Phi Beta Sorority House (Eugene, Oregon)